Lora Lazar is the pen name of a contemporary Bulgarian crime writer.

Education
The author graduated from the National School of Plastic Arts and the Dechko Uzunov Academy in Kazanlak before attending Sofia University, where she received a master's degree in History and Philosophy and a Postgraduate degree in Cultural Studies. In less than two years, four of her books were published in Bulgaria.

Works
In December 2011, her first novel The Cursed Goblet, appeared. The book won the national competition for crime novel or short story written "In Agatha Christie’s Footsteps", presented by the Bulgarian publisher "Era" and the website "I read".
Released in May 2012, Lazar's second novel The Sinful Neighbourhood was published by "Iztok-Zapad" and was included in their “Magica” series.
Her third novel was published by Trud in September, 2012, entitled Heavens of Sin.
Released on March 4, 2013, Lora Lazar's fourth novel A Borrowed Killer was published by "Iztok-Zapad" and is also included in their “Magica” series.
Released on October 10, 2013, Lora Lazar's latest novel, "The Merry Cemetеry", is published by "Iztok-Zapad" and is, again, included in their “Magica” series.

To date (12/2013) none of these novels have been translated into English.

Theatre
Lazar also writes for the stage. Her most successful pieces include: 
A Rose on Ice, which received recognition in a competition organised by the Pleven Municipality.
Graffiti, honored as the play which best reveals the problems of young people, at the fifth National School Theatre Festival, held in Ruse in 2010, 
Memento, which was a finalist in the Bulgarian National Playwriting Competition and was subsequently included in a special collection of plays. An English translation is available.

References

External links
 Lora Lazar: Official website
 Helikon.bg
 Erabooks.net
 Znamli.com
 Knigolandia.info

Bulgarian writers
Crime fiction writers
Bulgarian crime fiction writers
Living people
Year of birth missing (living people)